Jean-Claude Antonini (20 March 1940 – 8 February 2019) was a French politician who served as mayor of Angers between 1998 and 2012. He died from cancer on 8 February 2019 at the age of 78.

References

1940 births
2019 deaths
Politicians from Reims
Mayors of places in Pays de la Loire
Sciences Po alumni
University of Angers alumni
Socialist Party (France) politicians
French people of Italian descent
Deaths from cancer in France